Echinomacrurus occidentalis is a marine species of fish in the genus Echinomacrurus.

It is located in the Eastern Pacific, off the coast of Peru. It usually lives in deep water and has been known to go as deep as 4337 meters. The maximum length of an Echinomacrurus is about 37.0 cm.

References

Macrouridae
Taxa named by Tomio Iwamoto
Fish described in 1979